Bonneville-sur-Touques (Bonneville on Touques) is a commune in the Calvados department in the Normandy region in northwestern France, located four kilometres from the urban agglomeration Deauville-Trouville. The commune is principally famous for its 11th century castle, which protected the nearby supply port of Touques. The population is 325 (2019).

Etymology 
The name Bonneville is attested as far back as 1014, when it appeared in the form Bonnavilla. Old French bonne, or good, already had its current meaning at that time, and ville, or town, which in placenames often has its original meaning of rural area (from the Latin villa rustica), might here have the later sense of "village".

Government 
The municipal council has 11 members, including the mayor and two deputies.

List of Mayors

Demographics 
Bonneville-sur-Touques's peak population was 476 in 1876.

Significant sites 
 Château de Bonneville-sur-Touques, nicknamed "William the Conqueror's ruins" (11th century), classified as a historic monument since 16 November 1964
 Église Saint-Germain-et-Saint-Loup (18th century)
 Manoir de la Croix de fer (Iron Cross Manor), bought in 2006 by Tatiana Beck, for 1 million euros.

Notable residents 
 William the Conqueror frequently stayed at the castle when he went hunting in Saint-Gatien forest.
 John of England also lived at the castle.
 Tony O'Reilly, Irish businessman and former international rugby player

See also
Communes of the Calvados department

References

Further reading 
 Abbé Noël, Bonneville-sur-Touques, son château, son église, Impr. Domin, 1898
 André Gilbert, Le Château de Bonneville-sur-Touques, Delesques, Caen, 1894.
 Jean Bureau, Jean Chennebenoist et Gérard Léo, Touques, ses monuments, son passé. Le château de Bonneville, Trouville, 1968
 Georges Bernage, « Touques et Bonneville », Patrimoine normand, volume 16, sept.-oct. 1997

External links 

 Bonneville-sur-Touques on La communauté de communes (French)
 History and images of William the Conqueror's castle at Bonneville-sur-Touques

Communes of Calvados (department)